Milo White (August 17, 1830 – May 18, 1913) was an American businessman and politician who served as a United States representative from Minnesota.

Early life 
White was born in Fletcher, Vermont, on August 17, 1830. He attended local schools and Bakersfield Academy. He moved to Chatfield, Minnesota, in 1855 and engaged in mercantile pursuits.

Career 
White served as the chairman of Chatfield's board of supervisors when the city was organized in 1858. He served in the Minnesota Senate from 1872 to 1876, and again from 1881 to 1882. He was elected as a Republican to the Forty-eighth and Forty-ninth congresses (March 4, 1883 – March 3, 1887). After leaving Congress he resumed his mercantile pursuits.

White was an unsuccessful candidate for election in 1898 to the Fifty-sixth congress. He served as mayor of Chatfield for several terms, and also served as a member of the Chatfield school board.

Death 
White died in Chatfield on May 18, 1913. He was buried at Chatfield Cemetery in Chatfield.

References

Minnesota legislators Past and Present

External links

1830 births
1913 deaths
Republican Party members of the Minnesota House of Representatives
Republican Party Minnesota state senators
People from Franklin County, Vermont
People from Chatfield, Minnesota
Mayors of places in Minnesota
Republican Party members of the United States House of Representatives from Minnesota
School board members in Minnesota
19th-century American politicians